PANGAEA (Planetary Analogue Geological and Astrobiological Exercise for Astronauts) is an astronaut training course developed by the European Space Agency (ESA). It provides foundational knowledge and skills primarily in field geology to prepare astronauts for advanced mission-specific training for Moon and Mars missions. PANGAEA also incorporates the development and testing of technologies to support planetary exploration.

PANGAEA participants

PANGAEA has trained astronauts and cosmonauts from ESA, NASA and Roscosmos, including several from the Artemis Team.

PANGAEA 2016

Luca Parmitano – ESA astronaut
Matthias Maurer – ESA astronaut
Pedro Duque – ESA astronaut

PANGAEA 2017

Samantha Cristoforetti – ESA astronaut
Hervé Stevenin – ESA EVA instructor
William Carrey – ESA robotics engineer
Shahrzad Hosseini – ESA scientist

PANGAEA 2018

Thomas Reiter – ESA astronaut
Sergej Kud’-Sverčkov – Roscosmos cosmonaut 
Aidan Cowley – ESA science advisor and Spaceship EAC lead

PANGAEA 2021

Kathleen Rubins – NASA astronaut
Andreas Mogensen – ESA astronaut
Robin Eccleston – ESA research fellow

PANGAEA 2022

Stephanie Wilson – NASA astronaut
Alexander Gerst – ESA astronaut

References 

European Space Agency programmes